In a purely dialectological sense, Slovene dialects are the regionally diverse varieties that evolved from old Slovene, a South Slavic language of which the standardized modern version is Standard Slovene. This also includes several dialects in Croatia, most notably the so-called Western Goran dialect, which is actually Kostel dialect. In reality, speakers in Croatia self-identify themselves as speaking Croatian, which is a result of a ten centuries old country border passing through the dialects since the Francia. In addition, two dialects situated in Slovene (and the speakers self identify as speaking Slovene) did not evolve from Slovene (left out in the map on the right). The Čičarija dialect is a Chakavian dialect and parts of White Carniola were populated by Serbs during the Turkish invasion and therefore Shtokavian is spoken there.

Spoken Slovene is often considered to have at least 48 dialects and 13 subdialects. The exact number of dialects is open to debate, ranging from as many as 50 to merely 7. According to the official chart, published by the Fran Ramovš Institute, there are 48 dialects and 13 subdialects, but that includes all dialects spoken in Slovene. Čičarija dialect is included as a separate dialect and Shtokavian in White Carniola is merged with South White Carniolan. However, the official chart was not updated to include Čabar dialect, which was only recently been discovered to have evolved differently than Kostel dialect, under which it was traditionally listed. Therefore, that division includes 48 dialects and 13 subdialects.

The various dialects are so different from each other that a speaker of one dialect may have a very difficult time understanding a speaker of another, particularly if they belong to different regional groups. Speakers of dialects that strongly differ accommodate each other by gravitating toward standard Slovene. The only exception to that is the Resian dialect, which is the most isolated dialect, and on top of that, the speakers were never able to attend Slovene schools and are therefore completely unfamiliar with Standard Slovene.

Slovene dialects are part of the South Slavic dialect continuum, transitioning into Serbo-Croatian Kajkavian dialect to the southeast and Chakavian dialect to the southwest, but also bordering Friulian and Italian to the west, German to the north, and Hungarian to the northeast. The dialects are spoken primarily in Slovenia, but are extending in all neighboring countries Austria, Italy, Croatia, and Hungary.

History of research 
Primož Trubar, the author of the first Slovene book has already been aware of the wide diversity among the Slovene speakers and has written that some speakers might have a hard time understanding the book. First attempt to classify the dialects was made in 1809 by Jernej Kopitar, writing about two dialects in his Grammatik der slavischen Sprache in Krain, Kärnten und Steyermark. Fran Miklosich similarly split the language in two dialects, but focusing on the pronunciation of Proto-Slavic ê. This division was completely contradictory to Miklosich's one, so a conclusion that not enough data was gathered was reached.

Karel Glaser has made further divisions in 1898, dividing the varieties into the southeastern and northwestern dialect group, which were then subdivided into the Hungarian (now known as Panonian), Kajkavian (which he considered to be a Slovene dialect), other Styrian, Carinthian, Upper Carniolan, Lower Carniolan, Karst-Littoral, and Venetian dialects (now joined together as the Littoral dialect group) and was thus the first more serious attempt to classify the dialects.

Other attempts to classify the language were made by Izmail Sreznevsky in the early 19th century, followed by Jan Niecisław Baudouin de Courtenay (focusing on Resia, Venetian Slovenia, Cerkno, and Bled), Karel Štrekelj (focusing on the Karst), and Ivan Scheinig (focusing on Carinthia). This was followed by efforts by Ivan Grafenauer (Gail Valley), Josip Tominšek (Savinja Valley), and others.

Efforts before the Second World War were spearheaded by Lucien Tesnière, Fran Ramovš (which added the Rovte dialect group), and Aleksander Isachenko, and after the war by Tine Logar and Jakob Rigler (sl), which both made vital corrections to the Ramovš division.

Before the 21st century, it was known that Čičarija dialect was Chakavian, but it was only then discovered that the national borders also do not follow the Slovere–Serbo-Croatian border elsewhere. These changes are mostly accepted in Slovene and international literature, but not in Croatian, mainly because of the different institutes researching both countries and the speakers' self-identification.

Evolution 
All Slovene dialects originate from Old Slovene (also referred to as Alpine Slovene), present around 1000–1200. Alpine Slovene itself was formed from two transitional languages, Northwestern and Southeastern Alpine Slavic, which existed in 800–1000, when they both transitioned to Slovene.

Unification 

Northwestern Alpine Slavic formed in what is today southern Austria and eastern Italy and was initially showing signs of it actually being a West Slavic language, but the Southeastern was closer to Western Kajkavian and Chakavian, and was actually derived from the Southwestern Alpine-Western Panonian-Littoral South Slavic, from which Western Kajkavian and Chakavian were also formed. Proto-Slavic *vy- and *jьz-, both meaning "from" did not both exist in Alpine Slavic anymore. Northwestern Alpine Slavic kept the *vy- while the Southeastern kept the other one (PS *vy-bьrati / *jьz-bьrati "to choose", NWAS , SEAS , SS ).

Both forms then followed the same changes which then separated Slovene from other languages.

 Long and short circumflex vowels in words composed of (in the time of the transition) two or more syllables was moved to the following syllable, and lengthened (AS  "hay", Old Slovene ̑; AS  "oat", OS ).
 The short final acute syllable became unstressed: PS *(V̄̆)V̄V̍ / *V̄V̀ъ̯ / ь̯, AS , OS , for example PS *gně̄zdo̍ "nest", OS .
 All remaining unstressed long vowels became short.
 Stressed vowels became tense, lengthened, and consequently raised, and because of that they tend to diphthongize.
 Unstressed vowels were spoken loosely, because of which some get reduced in some dialects.
The last common language of the Slovenes, also called Alpine Slavic or Alpine Slovene (around 1200) had the following vowels:

All vowels could be long or short, stressed or unstressed. The Proto-Slavic vowel *y merged with *i. It is however debated what  was actually like. It might have sounded like  (like displayed above) or like .

The language also had the following consonants:

Notes:

 The labiodental fricative  was rare and only appeared in loanwords.
  was an allophone of  before a consonant, before a pause, or before the back vowels.

Fragmentation 
The language then very quickly split into two dialects, splitting almost entirely along the former Northwestern Alpine Slavic–Southeastern Alpine Slavic isogloss. The dialects then divided further into the northern, western, southern, and eastern dialect. After that, the dialects fragmented further, mostly influenced by geographical features and contact with other dialects and languages.

The nasal still exists only in Jaun Valley dialect, but other have so-called rinezem 'rhinism', in which the nasal vowel turns into a denasalized vowel and a nasal consonant; e.g., PS *mě̋sęcь "month", Gail Valley , SS .

The dialects then in 13th and 14 century further subdivided depending on how short acute vowels and  evolved. In the non-final syllables, all short vowels were turned into long acute vowels, except in eastern dialect. Northern Styrian dialect (which formed from the southern dialect), did not lengthen the vowels in syllables that were followed by two other. The short vowels in the last syllable evolved into short circumflex vowels in all dialects. The  evolved into  in west and most of the south dialect, but evolved into  in the 14th century. This change happened after the lengthening, so it also affected those vowels.

Formation of dialects 
From that, dialect bases formed. The northern dialect evolved into the Carinthian base, the predecessor of dialects in Carinthian dialect group and Resian dialect. The Western dialect evolved into two dialect bases: The Venetian-Karst base and the Soča–Idrija base, which evolved into northern Littoral and western Rovte dialects. The eastern dialect was the predecessor to Northern Styrian and Panonian bases; however, the southern dialect evolved into three bases: Southern Styrian, Lower Carniolan, and Upper Carniolan, which, apart from the eponyomous dialects, also evolved into southern Littoral dialects. At that time, many changes occurred which were not connected to the history of the dialect but more to the region where the dialects were spoken.

Consonants 
Parallel to the vowel changes, consonants also evolved, however not as much. The changes were the following:
  disappeared in some dialects.
 Sonorant  turned into  (IPA //) before vowels in most Slovene dialects and to  before a break or a consonant. In some dialects, it turned into the non-sononorant  (IPA //) and, like all other non-sonorants, has a voiceless version , used before the pause or another voiceless consonant.
  has in some dialects turned into .
 The palatal consonants evolved each differently:
  did not remain in any Slovene dialect.
 Some consonants got palatalized again before the front vowels. The dorsal non-sonorants also got simplified further:
  turned into , or further into .
  turned into , and then universally into .
  turned into , or further into .
 The consonants rarely also broke into  + ,  + , and  + 
  tends to disappear in front of vowels.
  mostly turned into  before a pause or a consonant. In some dialects, it turned into a phoneme.

Accent shifts 
There were many accent shifts and other changes that did not happen in all dialects. Only the shifts  /  >  /  and  >  happened in all dialects, but others that happened later did not encompass all of them. The first happened in the 15th century, which moved the stress from the circumflex short open or closed final syllable to the preceding mid short syllable ( or ), turning it acute doing that (e. g.  > ). This change happened in most of the dialects (except a part of Rosen Valley, Resian, Torre Valley, Natisone Valley, and the southern part of Soča dialect), but many of them have lengthened the vowel into a long one. Another shift that happened in most dialects in the 17th century was the shift from the circumflex short open or closed final syllable to the preceding extra-short syllable and also turning it acute (e. g.  > ). This change did not happen where the   >  did not happen, but also in Upper Carniolan dialect group and Lower Carniolan dialect. Therefore, in Standard Slovene, both accents are allowed, but favoring the unshifted one.

Other shifts that happened in fewer dialects were:

 From short circumflex closed final syllables to the preceding syllable, turning it acute ( > ), which happened in some Littoral, Rovte, Styrian, and Lower Carniolan dialects in the 18th century.
 From short circumflex closed final syllables to a vowel two syllables in a word before, turning it acute (  > ), which happened in Karst, Inner Carniolan, Istrian, and in part Kostel dialect.
 From long circumflex syllable to a preceding syllable, shortening and turning it acute ( > ), which happened in many, not closely related and geographically separate dialects from the 18th century onwards.
 From long acute syllable to a preceding syllable while also shortening the vowel ( > ), which happened in Kostel and North White Carniolan dialects.
 From short acute first syllable in words with three syllables to a following syllable ( > ), which happened in a part of Rosen Valley, Jaun Valley, Mežica, North Pohorje-Remšnik, Upper Savinja, Kozjak subdialect, and a part of Torre Valley dialect.
 From long acute first syllable in words with two syllables to a following syllable, but the destressed vowel is still long and the new vowel is short and circumflex ( > ), which happened in a part of Torre Valley dialect.

Classification 
Dialects can be classified in two ways. The most common is the horizontal division, which groups dialects by how they sound today, but there is also the vertical division, which classifies the dialects by how they evolved. Therefore, the criteria for vertical division are mostly the older changes (listed above) and younger for the horizontal division. The groups of dialects in horizontal division are called "dialect groups" ( or ) and those in vertical division are called "dialect bases".

The dialects can also have several subdialects, and are further divided into microdialects (lit. speeches).

Horizontal division 
Horizontal division used today is a refined version of division proposed by Ramovš in 1935. He grouped the dialects by the general sound and feel of the dialect, as many Slovenes similarly divided the dialect prior to proper research.

He grouped the dialects into eight distinct groups: The Carinthian, Littoral, Rovte, Upper Carniolan, Lower Carniolan, Styrian, Pannonian, and Mixed Kočevje dialects, which he did not even research. According to the now official chart, the only change is the inclusion of Mixed Kočevje dialects into the Lower Carniolan group:

 The Carinthian dialect group: spoken by Carinthian Slovenes in Austria, in Slovenian Carinthia, and in the northwestern parts of Slovenian Styria along the upper Drava Valley, and in the westernmost areas of Upper Carniola on the border with Italy.
 The Littoral dialect group, spoken in most of the Slovenian Littoral (except for the area around Tolmin and Cerkno, where Rovte dialects are spoken) and in the western part of Inner Carniola; it is also spoken by Slovenes in the Italian provinces of Trieste and Gorizia, and in the mountainous areas of eastern Friuli (Venetian Slovenia and Resia). This group includes very heterogeneous dialects. Among other features, it is characterized by diphthongization of yat >  and   > , which were also borrowed by southern dialect. The western dialects in this group have preserved pitch accent whereas the others have a non-tonal stress accent and some do not even differentiate between long and short vowels.
 The Rovte dialect group, spoken in the mountainous areas of west-central Slovenia, on the border between the Slovenian Littoral, Upper Carniola, and Inner Carniola, in a triangle between the towns of Tolmin, Škofja Loka, and Vrhnika.
 The Upper Carniolan dialect group, spoken in most of Upper Carniola and in Ljubljana. Among other features, this group is characterized by monophthongal stressed vowels, an acute semivowel, pitch accent, standard circumflex shift, and two accentual retractions with some exceptions.
 The Lower Carniolan dialect group, spoken in most of Lower Carniola and in the eastern half of Inner Carniola. Among other features, this group is characterized by pitch accent, extensive diphththongization, an -colored , shift of  > , and partial akanye.
 The Styrian dialect group, spoken in central and eastern Slovenian Styria and in the Lower Sava Valley and Central Sava Valley. Among other features, this group is characterized by loss of pitch accent, tonemically high and lengthened accented syllables, lengthening of accented short syllables, and frequent development of  > , and  >  in the eastern part of the territory.
 The Pannonian dialect group, or northeastern dialect group, spoken in northeastern Slovenia (Prekmurje, in the eastern areas of Slovenian Styria), and among the Hungarian Slovenes. Among other features, this group is characterized by loss of pitch accent, non-lengthened short syllables, and a new acute on short syllables.

The horizontal division is in professional literature based on various non-linguistic and linguistic factors. Non-linguistic factors include settlement patterns and geographical features (rivers, mountains) that helped shape various isoglosses. Linguistic factors include language contact with non-Slavic languages to some extent, phonological and prosodic elements in particular, and to a lesser extent word-formational, lexical, and inflectional elements. Specifically, the primary distinguishing linguistic features are preservation or loss of pitch accent, reflexes of nasal *ę, nasal *ǫ, yat (ě), and the yers (ъ, ь), but also (to a lesser extent) vowel inventory, diphthongization, and degree and type of vowel reduction.

Vertical division 

The dialects can be split into eight dialect bases that formed from the 15th century onward, emerging from the four dialects. The bases are:

 Northwestern dialect
 Northern dialect
 Carinthian dialect base, which evolved into Carinthian dialects and into Resian dialect in the Littoral dialect group.
 Western dialect
 Venetian-Karst dialect base, which evolved into Natisone and Torre Valley dialects, Brda dialect, and Karst dialect in the Littoral dialect group.
 Soča-Idrija dialect base, which evolved into Soča dialect in the Littoral dialect group and into Tolmin, Cerkno, and Črni Vrh dialects, which are in Rovte dialect group.
 Southeastern dialect
 Southern dialect
 Upper Carniolan dialect base, which evolved into Upper Carniolan dialects, as well as Horjul, Škofja Loka, and Poljane dialects in Rovte dialect group.
 Lower Carniolan dialect base, which evolved into Lower Carniolan dialects, but also Inner Carniolan and Istrian dialects in Littoral dialect group and the Lower Sava Valley dialect in Styrian dialect group.
 Southern Styrian dialect base, which evolved into Central Styrian, Kozje-Bizeljsko, and Central Savinja dialects in Styrian dialect group.
 Eastern dialect
 Northern Styrian dialect base, which evolved into South Pohorje, and Upper Savinja dialects in Styrian dialect group.
 Pannonian dialect base, which evolved into Pannonian dialects.

List of dialects 
The following grouping of dialects and subdialects is based on the official map of Slovene dialects by Fran Ramovš, Tine Logar, and Jakob Rigler (sl) (from which the first Slovene term listed in parentheses is taken), with additions of Matej Šekli and other sources.

See also 

 The official chart of Slovene dialects and other Slavic dialects spoken in Slovenia (in Slovene)
 Interactive chart of Slovene dialects and other Slavic dialects spoken in Slovenia with audio examples (in Slovene)

References

Bibliography 

 
 
 
 
 

 
Slovene language
Dialects by language